Bibirevo may refer to:
Bibirevo District, a district of North-Eastern Administrative Okrug of Moscow, Russia
Bibirevo (village), a village in Tver Oblast, Russia
Bibirevo (Metro), a station of the Moscow Metro, Moscow, Russia